Marcel Baude (born 5 October 1989) is a German footballer who plays as a right-back.

Career

Baude came through Chemnitzer FC's youth and reserve reans, and made his debut in a 6–0 win over VfB Lübeck in September 2010, as a substitute for Ronny Garbuschewski. This was to be his only first-team appearance of the season, as Chemnitz won the Regionalliga Nord title. His next appearance was in the 3. Liga, over a year later, when he replaced Benjamin Förster in the last minute of a 2–1 win over Wacker Burghausen. He signed for Hallescher FC in July 2013.

External links 
 
 

1989 births
Living people
German footballers
Association football defenders
3. Liga players
Regionalliga players
Chemnitzer FC players
Hallescher FC players
FC Energie Cottbus players
VfB Auerbach players